Frederick John Kingshott (20 June 1929 - 6 April 2009) was an English professional footballer. He played for Doncaster Rovers and Gillingham between 1955 and 1960.

References

1929 births
2009 deaths
English footballers
Gillingham F.C. players
Doncaster Rovers F.C. players
Footballers from St Pancras, London
Association football goalkeepers